The 1996–97 season was the 93rd season in the history of FC Schalke 04 and the club's sixth consecutive season in the top flight of German football.

Season summary
Schalke claimed the UEFA Cup, defeating Roy Hodgson's Inter Milan 2–1 on aggregate in the final. The European triumph allowed Schalke to compete in the UEFA Cup the next season despite a 12th placed finish - a disappointing finish after finishing third the previous season.

Competitions

Bundesliga

League table

DFB-Pokal

UEFA Cup

Final

Squad
Squad at end of season

Left club during season

References

Schalke 04
FC Schalke 04 seasons
UEFA Europa League-winning seasons